Computational statistics, or statistical computing, is the bond between statistics and computer science. It means statistical methods that are enabled by using computational methods. It is the area of computational science (or scientific computing) specific to the mathematical science of statistics. This area is also developing rapidly, leading to calls that a broader concept of computing should be taught as part of general statistical education.

As in traditional statistics the goal is to transform raw data into knowledge, but the focus lies on computer intensive statistical methods, such as cases with very large sample size and non-homogeneous data sets.

The terms 'computational statistics' and 'statistical computing' are often used interchangeably, although Carlo Lauro (a former president of the International Association for Statistical Computing) proposed making a distinction, defining 'statistical computing' as "the application of computer science to statistics",
and 'computational statistics' as "aiming at the design of algorithm for implementing
statistical methods on computers, including the ones unthinkable before the computer
age (e.g. bootstrap, simulation), as well as to cope with analytically intractable problems" [sic].

The term 'Computational statistics' may also be used to refer to computationally intensive statistical methods including resampling methods, Markov chain Monte Carlo methods, local regression, kernel density estimation, artificial neural networks and generalized additive models.

History 
Though computational statistics is widely used today, it actually has a relatively short history of acceptance in the statistics community. For the most part, the founders of the field of statistics relied on mathematics and asymptotic approximations in the development of computational statistical methodology. 

In statistical field, the first use of the term “computer” comes in an article in the Journal of the American Statistical Association archives by Robert P. Porter in 1891. The article discusses about the use of Hermann Hollerith’s machine in the 11th Census of the United States. Hermann Hollerith’s machine, also called tabulating machine, was an electromechanical machine designed to assist in summarizing information stored on punched cards. It was invented by Herman Hollerith (February 29, 1860 – November 17, 1929), an American businessman, inventor, and statistician. His invention of the punched card tabulating machine was patented in 1884, and later was used in the 1890 Census of the United States. The advantages of the technology were immediately apparent. the 1880 Census, with about 50 million people, and it took over 7 years to tabulate. While in the 1890 Census, with over 62 million people, it took less than a year. This marks the beginning of the era of mechanized computational statistics and semiautomatic data processing systems.

In 1908, William Sealy Gosset performed his now well-known Monte Carlo method simulation which led to the discovery of the Student’s t-distribution. With the help of computational methods, he also has plots of the empirical distributions overlaid on the corresponding theoretical distributions. The computer has revolutionized simulation and has made the replication of Gosset’s experiment little more than an exercise. 

Later on, the scientists put forward computational ways of generating pseudo-random deviates, performed methods to convert uniform deviates into other distributional forms using inverse cumulative distribution function or acceptance-rejection methods, and developed state-space methodology for Markov chain Monte Carlo. One of the first efforts to generate random digits in a fully automated way, was undertaken by the RAND Corporation in 1947. The tables produced were published as a book in 1955, and also as a series of punch cards. 

By the mid-1950s, several articles and patents for devices had been proposed for random number generators. The development of these devices were motivated from the need to use random digits to perform simulations and other fundamental components in statistical analysis. One of the most well known of such devices is ERNIE, which produces random numbers that determine the winners of the Premium Bond, a lottery bond issued in the United Kingdom. In 1958, John Tukey’s jackknife was developed. It is as a method to reduce the bias of parameter estimates in samples under nonstandard conditions. This requires computers for practical implementations. To this point, computers have made many tedious statistical studies feasible.

Methods

Maximum likelihood estimation 
Maximum likelihood estimation is used to estimate the parameters of an assumed probability distribution, given some observed data. It is achieved by maximizing a likelihood function so that the observed data is most probable under the assumed statistical model.

Monte Carlo method 
Monte Carlo a statistical method relies on repeated random sampling to obtain numerical results. The concept is to use randomness to solve problems that might be deterministic in principle. They are often used in physical and mathematical problems and are most useful when it is difficult to use other approaches. Monte Carlo methods are mainly used in three problem classes: optimization, numerical integration, and generating draws from a probability distribution.

Markov chain Monte Carlo 
The Markov chain Monte Carlo method creates samples from a continuous random variable, with probability density proportional to a known function. These samples can be used to evaluate an integral over that variable, as its expected value or variance. The more steps are included, the more closely the distribution of the sample matches the actual desired distribution.

Applications 

 Computational biology
 Computational linguistics
 Computational physics
 Computational mathematics
 Computational materials science

Computational statistics journals
Communications in Statistics - Simulation and Computation
Computational Statistics
Computational Statistics & Data Analysis
Journal of Computational and Graphical Statistics
Journal of Statistical Computation and Simulation
Journal of Statistical Software
The R Journal
The Stata Journal
Statistics and Computing
Wiley Interdisciplinary Reviews Computational Statistics

Associations
International Association for Statistical Computing

See also
Algorithms for statistical classification
Data science
Statistical methods in artificial intelligence
Free statistical software
List of statistical algorithms
List of statistical packages
Machine learning

References

Further reading

Articles

Books

External links

Associations
International Association for Statistical Computing
Statistical Computing section of the American Statistical Association

Journals
Computational Statistics & Data Analysis
Journal of Computational & Graphical Statistics 
Statistics and Computing

 
Numerical analysis
Computational fields of study
Mathematics of computing